NGC 351 is a spiral galaxy in the constellation Cetus. It was discovered on November 10, 1885 by Lewis Swift. It was described by Dreyer as "extremely faint, pretty small, northwestern of 2.", the other being NGC 353.

References

External links
 

0351
18851110
Cetus (constellation)
Barred spiral galaxies
003693